Sardar Mohammad Khan Qaraei-Torbati, was one of the wealthiest and most powerful chieftains in Khorasan during the reigns of Fath Ali Shah. He was admired by his friends and cursed by his foes.

The Qajar central government attempted to conciliate the new ruler of Turbat by recalling Muhammad Wali Mirza to Tehran, dishonoring him while there, and sending Hasan Ali Mirza Qajar Shoja os Saltaneh in his place. Hasan Ali ventured to Zaveh to attempt to placate Mohammad Khan for the treacherous murder of his father. The essence of the lies exchanged at their meeting was that Tehran denied any implication in the murder of Eshaq while Mohammad professed allegiance to the Qajars. The deal was sealed with Mohammad granting his sister to Hasan Ali Mirza for marriage. The result of this marriage was Qahreman Mirza Qajar ancestor of famous Qahreman, Qahremani and Shojania families of Khorasan.

After Hasan Ali's departure Mohammad aligned himself with Bunyad Khan Hazara and began a career of depredation and slave dealing. This latter practice gained him covert alliances with the Khan of Khiva and the Emir of Bukhara, a situation that did little to enhance his reputation in Tehran. In 1832 the crown prince, Abbas Mirza, after subduing the Salor of Sarakhs, turned his attention to Mohammad Khan and his renegade tribe. Under the guise of using Zaveh as a staging ground for his army's invasion of Herat, Abbas moved the royal forces into the Qaraei district where he deceived Mohammad into a meeting that resulted in his capture.

The independence of the Qaraei tribe and the district of Zaveh ended with Mohammad Khan. The governors of the district were thereafter no longer of the Qaraei tribe but of the Qajar tribe. The chief of the Qarais traditionally served alternate terms of naib and vazir to the Qajar governor for the rest of the 19th century. Mohammad Khan died comfortably, a prisoner in his own house in Tabriz.

Positions held
Hakim of Ghurian 1813–1816
Hakim of Mashhad 1829
Hakim of Dowlatabad (Khorasan) 1816-1833
Ilkhan of Qaraei tribe 1816-1833
Vazir to Governor of Khorasan
Sardar(Commander-in-Chief) of Persian army, in Khorasan

References

Iranian military commanders
1790s births
1850s deaths
People of Qajar Iran
People from Razavi Khorasan Province